Nadine "Hi-Hat" Ruffin is a choreographer of hip-hop dance from New York City. She has worked with Montell Jordan, Big Time Rush, Teddy Riley, P-Diddy, Wyclef, Shakira, Rihanna, Mary J. Blige, Eve, and Jay-Z. Ruffin's work is featured in many Missy Elliott music videos, such as "All n My Grill", "She's a Bitch", "Hit Em wit da Hee", "Sock It To Me", "Beep Me 911", "Get Ur Freak On", and "One Minute Man". Ruffin has served as a guest judge on the American dance competition reality TV series So You Think You Can Dance.

Filmography 
Ruffin has choreographed the following television shows and movies:
 Bring It On
 Step Up 3-D
 Step Up 2 
 The Ellen DeGeneres Show
 Late Night with Jimmy Fallon
 Lopez Tonight
 2009 American Music Awards
 Late Show with David Letterman
 Saturday Night Live
 Jimmy Kimmel Live!
 MTV Video Music Awards
 America's Got Talent
 The Oprah Winfrey Show
 The 51st Annual Grammy Awards
 Kung Fu Panda
 4th Annual VH1 Hip Hop Honors
 I Now Pronounce You Chuck & Larry
 How She Move
 Stick It
 Chicken Little
 The 2nd Annual Vibe Awards
 Shark Tale
 The Girl Next Door
 The Nick at Nite Holiday Special
 The Hot Chick
 Clockstoppers
 Charlie's Angels
 The Rugrats Movie

References 

Living people
Year of birth missing (living people)
American choreographers